Hans-Jürgen Bäsler (28 March 1938 – May 2002) was a German footballer.

Bäsler made 17 appearances in the Bundesliga during his playing career.

References

External links 
 

1938 births
2002 deaths
German footballers
Association football defenders
Bundesliga players
Arminia Bielefeld players